The 4 × 100 metres relay or sprint relay is an athletics track event run in lanes over one lap of the track with four runners completing 100 metres each. The first runners must begin in the same stagger as for the individual 400 m race. Each runner carries a relay baton. Before 2018, the baton had to be passed within a 20 m changeover box, preceded by a 10-metre acceleration zone.  With a rule change effective November 1, 2017, that zone was modified to include the acceleration zone as part of the passing zone, making the entire zone 30 metres in length. The outgoing runner cannot touch the baton until it has entered the zone, and the incoming runner cannot touch it after it has left the zone. The zone is usually marked in yellow, frequently using lines, triangles or chevrons. While the rule book specifies the exact positioning of the marks, the colours and style are only "recommended". While most legacy tracks will still have the older markings, the rule change still uses existing marks. Not all governing body jurisdictions have adopted the rule change.

The transfer of the baton in this race is typically blind. The outgoing runner reaches a straight arm backwards when entering the changeover box or when the incoming runner makes a verbal signal. The outgoing runner does not look back, and it is the responsibility of the incoming runner to thrust the baton into the outstretched hand and not let go until the outgoing runner takes hold of it without crossing the changeover box and stops after the baton is exchanged. Runners on the first and third legs typically run on the inside of the lane with the baton in their right hand, while runners on the second and fourth legs take the baton in their left. Polished handovers can compensate for lack of basic speed to some extent, and disqualification for dropping the baton or failing to transfer it within the box is common, even at the highest level. Relay times are typically 2–3 seconds faster than the sum of best times of individual runners.

The United States men and women historically dominated this event through the 20th century, winning Olympic gold medals and the most IAAF world championships. Carl Lewis ran the anchor leg on U.S. relay teams that set six world records from 1983 to 1992, including the first team to break 38 seconds.

The current men's world record stands at 36.84, set by the Jamaican team at the final of the 2012 London Olympic Games on 11 August 2012. As the only team to break 37 seconds to date, Jamaica has been the dominant team in the sport, winning two consecutive Olympic Gold Medals and four consecutive World Championships. The Jamaican team also set the previous record of 37.04 seconds at the 2011 World Championships.

The fastest electronically timed anchor leg run is 8.65 seconds by Usain Bolt at the 2015 IAAF World Relays, while Bob Hayes was hand-timed as running 8.7 seconds  on a cinder track in the 1964 Tokyo Games Final. The Tokyo Games also had electronic timing. High-speed modern video analysis shows his time to be a more realistic 8.95-9.0 seconds in the final, a much more consistent time relative to his Fully Automatic Timing 10.06s 100m world record and more in line with the usual +0.25s-0.3s hand time to FAT conversion.

The women's world record stands at 40.82 seconds, set by the United States in 2012 at the London Olympics. The fastest anchor leg run by a woman was run by Christine Arron of France, timed unofficially at 9.67s.

According to the IAAF rules, world records in relays can only be set if all team members have the same nationality.

Continental records 
Updated 5 October 2019

All-time top 10 by country

Key to tables:

X = annulled due to doping violation

Men
Correct as of June 2022

Women
Correct as of August 2021

All-time top 25

Men
Updated July 2022

Note:
 A USA team ran 37.04 in London in 2012 but the performance was annulled due to use of performance-enhancing drugs by Tyson Gay
 A Jamaican team ran 37.10 in Beijing in 2008 but the performance was annulled due to use of performance-enhancing drugs by Nesta Carter
 A USA team ran 37.38 in the heats in London in 2012 but the performance was retrospectively disqualified following drug test failure by Tyson Gay, even though Gay only ran in the final and not the heat.
 A UK team ran 37.51 in Tokyo in 2021 but the performance was annulled due to use of performance-enhancing drugs by Chijindu Ujah

Women
Correct as of July 2022

Olympic Games medalists

Men

Women

World Championships medalists

Men

Women

See also
Men's 4 × 100 metres relay world record progression
Women's 4 × 100 metres relay world record progression
Italy national relays team at the international athletics championships
List of fastest anchor legs

Notes and references

External links
IAAF list of 4x100-metres-relay records in XML

 
Events in track and field
Track relay races
Summer Olympic disciplines in athletics